is a Japanese actress.

Career
Ikewaki was given a Best New Talent award at the 2000 Yokohama Film Festival for her performance in Osaka Story.  She appeared in Kiyoshi Kurosawa's 2012 television drama Penance. She has also appeared in films such as Sword of Desperation and Looking for a True Fiancee.

Filmography

Film

Television

References

External links
 
 
 

Actresses from Osaka
People from Higashiōsaka
Japanese film actresses
Japanese television actresses
1981 births
Living people
Asadora lead actors
Best Supporting Actress Asian Film Award winners
20th-century Japanese actresses
21st-century Japanese actresses